The 2010–11 Druga HNL (also known as 2. HNL) was the 20th season of Croatia's second level football competition since its establishment in 1992. RNK Split were league champions and were promoted to Prva HNL at the end of the previous season. The competition started on 21 August 2010 and ended on 29 May 2011.

Format
The league was contested by 16 teams (two more than in the previous season). Despite planned reduction in the number of clubs in Prva HNL for the 2011–12 season (in which the top flight was set to be reduced from 16 to 12 clubs), CFF Assembly on 17 December 2010 delayed the execution of this changes by one year. In that scenario five clubs would have been relegated from top level to Druga HNL and Druga HNL winners promoted to top level, with five teams relegated from Druga HNL to third level.

Instead, Druga HNL will stay at 16 teams with only the last four teams being relegated and the first three teams from 2010–11 Druga HNL earning promotion (if they are granted with top level license). As for promotion from third level, winners of all three divisions of Treća HNL (West, East and South) will be promoted to Druga HNL, while the fourth club will be decided from a qualifying round between second-placed teams from East and West division.

Changes from last season
The following clubs have been promoted or relegated at the end of the 2009–10 season:

From 2. HNL
Promoted to 1. HNL
 RNK Split (winners of 2009–10 Druga HNL)
 Hrvatski Dragovoljac (3rd place)

Relegated to 3. HNL
 Moslavina (13th place)
 Segesta (14th place)

To 2. HNL
Relegated from 1. HNL
 Međimurje (15th place)
 Croatia Sesvete (16th place)

Promoted from 3. HNL
 Dugopolje (3. HNL South winners)
 Gorica (3. HNL West winners)
 HAŠK (3. HNL West runners-up)
 MV Croatia (3. HNL East runners-up)

Clubs

League table

Results

Top goalscorers
The top scorers in the 2010–11 Druga HNL season were:

See also
2010–11 Prva HNL
2010–11 Croatian Cup

References

External links
Official website  

First Football League (Croatia) seasons
Drug
Cro